The 2017–18 season was Associazione Calcio ChievoVerona's tenth consecutive season in Serie A. Chievo competed in Serie A, finishing 13th, and the Coppa Italia, where they were eliminated in the fourth round by city rivals Hellas Verona.

Italian striker Roberto Inglese was the club's top scorer, with 12 goals in Serie A and one in the Coppa Italia.

Players

Squad information

Transfers

In

Loans in

Out

Loans out

Pre-season and friendlies

Competitions

Serie A

League table

Results summary

Results by round

Matches

Coppa Italia

Statistics

Appearances and goals

|-
! colspan=14 style="background:#FFFF00; color:blue; border:2px solid blue; text-align:center"| Goalkeepers

|-
! colspan=14 style="background:#FFFF00; color:blue; border:2px solid blue; text-align:center"| Defenders

|-
! colspan=14 style="background:#FFFF00; color:blue; border:2px solid blue; text-align:center"| Midfielders

|-
! colspan=14 style="background:#FFFF00; color:blue; border:2px solid blue; text-align:center"| Forwards

|-
! colspan=14 style="background:#FFFF00; color:blue; border:2px solid blue; text-align:center"| Players transferred out during the season

Goalscorers

Last updated: 20 May 2018

Clean sheets

Last updated: 20 May 2018

Disciplinary record

Last updated: 20 May 2018

References

A.C. ChievoVerona seasons
Chievo